Emily Mae Smith (born 1979) is a visual artist from Austin, Texas.

Biography
Emily Mae Smith (born 1979) is a visual artist from Austin, Texas who lives and works in Brooklyn, New York. Smith typically creates narrative oil paintings. In Patricia Hickson’s text about Emily Mae Smith’s exhibition at the Wadsworth Atheneum, she writes, “With a nod to distinct painting movements in the history of art, such as Symbolism, Surrealism, and Pop art, Emily Mae Smith creates lively compositions that offer sly social and political commentary.”

Education 
Smith attended the University of Texas from 1997-2002, receiving a B.F.A. in Studio Art. Upon graduating in 2002, she was presented with the Roy Crane Award by the University of Texas. In 2005, Smith received the Edward Mazzella Jr. Scholarship from Columbia University. And in 2006, she received her M.F.A. in Visual Art from Columbia University.

Selected works

Symbolism of the broom 
An anthropomorphized broom is a reoccurring symbol in Smith’s works. Patricia Hickson writes, “Leading with humor, she presents a vocabulary of signs and symbols that start with her avatar, inspired by the bewitched broomstick figure from The Sorcerer’s Apprentice sequence in Disney’s animated film Fantasia (1940). This unlikely (…) choice is an astute one as the broom simultaneously alludes to a painter’s brush, a domestic tool associated with women’s work, and the phallus. Smith’s flexible character has continued to evolve across her body of work. By adopting a wide variety of guises, the broom and a stock pile of other coded symbols speak to timely, relevant subjects, including gender, sexuality, capitalism, and violence.”

The Studio series

Exhibitions 
Smith has had solo exhibitions at multiple institutions around the world, such as MATRIX 181, curated by Patricia Hickson at the Wadsworth Atheneum, Hartford, Connecticut, 2019; Emily Mae Smith, curated by Eric Troncy at Le Consortium, Dijon, France, 2018; and The Little Apocrypha, with Adam Henry & Emily Mae Smith at SALTS art center, Birsfelden, Switzerland, 2017. She has also been featured in prominent art galleries including Perrotin, Tokyo (upcoming in September 2019); Contemporary Fine Arts, Berlin, Germany; Simone Subal Gallery, New York; and Rodolphe Janssen, Brussels, Belgium. She has participated in group shows in galleries including Perrotin, Peter Freeman, Tanya Bonakdar Gallery, Kohn Gallery, König, and Marlborough Fine Art.

Art market  
Smith has been represented by Galerie Perrotin since 2019.

Recognition  
 2018 

New York Foundation for the Arts Fellowship in Painting

 2005 

Edward Mazella Jr. Scholarship, Columbia University

 2002 

Roy Crane Award, University of Texas 

 1999-2001 

University of Texas Department of Art Merit Awards

References 

Artists from Texas

1979 births
Living people
University of Texas at Austin alumni